Le Crêt de la Neige is the highest peak in the Jura Mountains and the department of Ain in France. Its elevation is 1720 m above sea level (reported as 1718 m before 2003). Its prominence is 1260 m. It is located in the commune of Thoiry.

References

Mountains of Ain
Mountains of the Jura